A.O. Mykonos was a Greek football club based in Mykonos, Cyclades, Greece.

The club was founded in 1981. They will play in Gamma Ethniki for the season 2013–14. Álvaro Arbeloa, ex-Real Madrid LB, will be the manager for the upcoming season.

Honours

Domestic
 Cyclades Champions: 6
 1989–90, 1991–92, 1997–98, 1999–00, 2000–01, 2008–09
 Cyclades Cup Winners: 8
 1998–99, 1999–00, 2000–01, 2001–02, 2002–03, 2007–08, 2009–10, 2010-11

References

External links

Defunct football clubs in Greece
Football clubs in South Aegean
Association football clubs established in 1981
1981 establishments in Greece